José Luis Tancredi Malatez (born 14 February 1983) is a Uruguayan footballer that currently plays for Cerro in the Liga de Fútbol Profesional Boliviano. He plays as a midfielder.

Club career
In 2011, he joined Colombian side Millonarios. Whilst he was playing for the club during the season, he suffered a tibia and perone injury after receiving a hard tackle from América de Cali defender Andrés Cadavid during a league match.

On 13 June 2015, it was confirmed that he signed for Chilean club Magallanes of the second-tier.

References

External links
 
 

1983 births
Living people
Uruguayan footballers
Uruguayan expatriate footballers
Uruguayan Primera División players
Uruguayan Segunda División players
Primera B de Chile players
Categoría Primera A players
Bolivian Primera División players
C.A. Cerro players
C.A. Bella Vista players
Deportivo Táchira F.C. players
Millonarios F.C. players
Cúcuta Deportivo footballers
Patriotas Boyacá footballers
Deportes Quindío footballers
Racing Club de Montevideo players
Magallanes footballers
Club San José players
Expatriate footballers in Chile
Expatriate footballers in Ecuador
Expatriate footballers in Colombia
Expatriate footballers in Venezuela
Expatriate footballers in Bolivia
Footballers from Montevideo
Association football midfielders